"The Unreasonable Effectiveness of Mathematics in the Natural Sciences" is a 1960 article by the physicist Eugene Wigner. In the paper, Wigner observes that a physical theory's mathematical structure often points the way to further advances in that theory and even to empirical predictions.

Original paper and Wigner's observations 

Wigner begins his paper with the belief, common among those familiar with mathematics, that mathematical concepts have applicability far beyond the context in which they were originally developed. Based on his experience, he writes, "it is important to point out that the mathematical formulation of the physicist's often crude experience leads in an uncanny number of cases to an amazingly accurate description of a large class of phenomena". He then invokes the fundamental law of gravitation as an example. Originally used to model freely falling bodies on the surface of the earth, this law was extended on the basis of what Wigner terms "very scanty observations" to describe the motion of the planets, where it "has proved accurate beyond all reasonable expectations".

Another oft-cited example is Maxwell's equations, derived to model the elementary electrical and magnetic phenomena known as of the mid-19th century. The equations also describe radio waves, discovered by David Edward Hughes in 1879, around the time of James Clerk Maxwell's death. Wigner sums up his argument by saying that "the enormous usefulness of mathematics in the natural sciences is something bordering on the mysterious and that there is no rational explanation for it". He concludes his paper with the same question with which he began:

The miracle of the appropriateness of the language of mathematics for the formulation of the laws of physics is a wonderful gift which we neither understand nor deserve. We should be grateful for it and hope that it will remain valid in future research and that it will extend, for better or for worse, to our pleasure, even though perhaps also to our bafflement, to wide branches of learning.

Wigner's work provided a fresh insight into both physics and the philosophy of mathematics, and has been fairly often cited in the academic literature on the philosophy of physics and of mathematics. Wigner speculated on the relationship between the philosophy of science and the foundations of mathematics as follows:

It is difficult to avoid the impression that a miracle confronts us here, quite comparable in its striking nature to the miracle that the human mind can string a thousand arguments together without getting itself into contradictions, or to the two miracles of laws of nature and of the human mind's capacity to divine them.

Later, Hilary Putnam (1975) explained the aforementioned two "miracles" as necessary consequences of a realist (but not Platonist) view of the philosophy of mathematics. But in a passage discussing cognitive bias Wigner cautiously called "not reliable", he went further:

The writer is convinced that it is useful, in epistemological discussions, to abandon the idealization that the level of human intelligence has a singular position on an absolute scale. In some cases it may even be useful to consider the attainment which is possible at the level of the intelligence of some other species.

Whether humans checking the results of humans can be considered an objective basis for observation of the known (to humans) universe is an interesting question, one followed up in both cosmology and the philosophy of mathematics.

Wigner also laid out the challenge of a cognitive approach to integrating the sciences:

A much more difficult and confusing situation would arise if we could, some day, establish a theory of the phenomena of consciousness, or of biology, which would be as coherent and convincing as our present theories of the inanimate world.

He further proposed that arguments could be found that might

put a heavy strain on our faith in our theories and on our belief in the reality of the concepts which we form. It would give us a deep sense of frustration in our search for what I called 'the ultimate truth'. The reason that such a situation is conceivable is that, fundamentally, we do not know why our theories work so well. Hence, their accuracy may not prove their truth and consistency. Indeed, it is this writer's belief that something rather akin to the situation which was described above exists if the present laws of heredity and of physics are confronted.

Responses 

Wigner's original paper has provoked and inspired many responses across a wide range of disciplines. These include Richard Hamming in computer science, Arthur Lesk in molecular biology,  Peter Norvig in data mining,  Max Tegmark in physics, Ivor Grattan-Guinness in mathematics and Vela Velupillai in economics.

Richard Hamming

Mathematician and Turing Award laureate Richard Hamming reflected on and extended Wigner's Unreasonable Effectiveness in 1980, mulling over four "partial explanations" for it. Hamming concluded that the four explanations he gave were unsatisfactory. They were:

1. Humans see what they look for. The belief that science is experimentally grounded is only partially true. Rather, our intellectual apparatus is such that much of what we see comes from the glasses we put on. Eddington went so far as to claim that a sufficiently wise mind could deduce all of physics, illustrating his point with the following joke: "Some men went fishing in the sea with a net, and upon examining what they caught they concluded that there was a minimum size to the fish in the sea."

Hamming gives four examples of nontrivial physical phenomena he believes arose from the mathematical tools employed and not from the intrinsic properties of physical reality.
 Hamming proposes that Galileo discovered the law of falling bodies not by experimenting, but by simple, though careful, thinking. Hamming imagines Galileo as having engaged in the following thought experiment (the experiment, which Hamming calls "scholastic reasoning", is described in Galileo's book On Motion.):

Suppose that a falling body broke into two pieces. Of course the two pieces would immediately slow down to their appropriate speeds. But suppose further that one piece happened to touch the other one. Would they now be one piece and both speed up? Suppose I tie the two pieces together. How tightly must I do it to make them one piece? A light string? A rope? Glue? When are two pieces one?

There is simply no way a falling body can "answer" such hypothetical "questions." Hence Galileo would have concluded that "falling bodies need not know anything if they all fall with the same velocity, unless interfered with by another force." After coming up with this argument, Hamming found a related discussion in Pólya (1963: 83-85). Hamming's account does not reveal an awareness of the 20th century scholarly debate over just what Galileo did.

The inverse square law of universal gravitation necessarily follows from the conservation of energy and of space having three dimensions. Measuring the exponent in the law of universal gravitation is more a test of whether space is Euclidean than a test of the properties of the gravitational field.
The inequality at the heart of the uncertainty principle of quantum mechanics follows from the properties of Fourier integrals and from assuming time invariance.
Hamming argues that Albert Einstein's pioneering work on special relativity was largely "scholastic" in its approach. He knew from the outset what the theory should look like (although he only knew this because of the Michelson–Morley experiment), and explored candidate theories with mathematical tools, not actual experiments. Hamming alleges that Einstein was so confident that his relativity theories were correct that the outcomes of observations designed to test them did not much interest him. If the observations were inconsistent with his theories, it would be the observations that were at fault.

2. Humans create and select the mathematics that fit a situation. The mathematics at hand does not always work. For example, when mere scalars proved awkward for understanding forces, first vectors, then tensors, were invented.

3. Mathematics addresses only a part of human experience. Much of human experience does not fall under science or mathematics but under the philosophy of value, including ethics, aesthetics, and political philosophy. To assert that the world can be explained via mathematics amounts to an act of faith.

4. Evolution has primed humans to think mathematically. The earliest lifeforms must have contained the seeds of the human ability to create and follow long chains of close reasoning.

Max Tegmark
A different response, advocated by physicist Max Tegmark, is that physics is so successfully described by mathematics because the physical world is completely mathematical, isomorphic to a mathematical structure, and that we are simply uncovering this bit by bit. The same interpretation had been advanced some years previously by Peter Atkins. In this interpretation, the various approximations that constitute our current physics theories are successful because simple mathematical structures can provide good approximations of certain aspects of more complex mathematical structures. In other words, our successful theories are not mathematics approximating physics, but simple mathematics approximating more complex mathematics.

Ivor Grattan-Guinness
Ivor Grattan-Guinness found the effectiveness in question eminently reasonable and explicable in terms of concepts such as analogy, generalisation and metaphor.

See also

References

Further reading 

, a piece of "mathematical fiction".

 

Books about philosophy of mathematics
1960 in science
1960 documents
Works originally published in American magazines
Works originally published in science and technology magazines
Books about philosophy of physics
Thought experiments in physics